The following highways are numbered 28B:

India
  National Highway 28B (India)

United States
 Nebraska Link 28B
 New York State Route 28B (former)